Aquinas College is an Australian co-educational Roman Catholic secondary school in the Melbourne suburb of Ringwood. It is a regional college of the Archdiocese of Melbourne, founded in 1961 to provide secondary education to Catholics residing in the Maroondah Deanery. Aquinas College endeavours to be a dynamic and innovative learning community, striving to create an environment to meet the diverse needs of all students. Aquinas is a place in which hospitality is valued and a warm welcome awaits. As a Regional College of the Archdiocese of Melbourne, the founders had a vision of high quality, affordable, Catholic education for local people and Aquinas proudly boast strong inter-generational connection to many families residing in this region. 

The College motto – Illuminare et Ardere is interpreted by us to mean To Light Up and Be on Fire. In all that happens at Aquinas there is great enthusiasm and as a school based on the gospel values of Jesus Christ making every endeavour to provide an enjoyable and challenging Catholic secondary education.

Aquinas College is committed to educating students to take their place in a global environment and to view the world from multiple perspectives with an awareness of God in their lives guided by the virtues taught by College Patron, St Thomas Aquinas, and the College values - spirituality, belonging, perseverance, compassion, stewardship and justice. 

The College is accredited with the highly regarded Council of International Schools which has over seven hundred members across the world. At the same time Aquinas College is committed to every student experiencing success in their personal learning and life development, and is proud of the expert staff, committed to enhancing the learning experience, encouraging differentiation and promoting individual resourcefulness. 

At Aquinas the focus is on every student finding opportunities to embrace their spirit and “discover their place” in a welcoming and supportive community.

History 

Aquinas Boys’ College was established on 8 February 1961. Administered by the Christian Brothers at the request of the founding parish priests, opening the doors to 130 boys in Forms 1 and 2.

Aquinas Girls' College became a reality in February 1967 with different orders of religious sisters supporting the college. During the second week of February they welcomed 84 girls into Form 1. As the numbers were diminishing in the religious orders, it became necessary for the sisters to withdraw their services at the end of 1978.

At the beginning of 1979 the boys and girls colleges amalgamated and became known as Aquinas College under lay administration. It incorporated the structure of three sub-schools; junior girls and boys (Years 7-10) and senior co-educational (Years 11-12) with an overall student population of approximately 1400 at the time.

In 2021, Aquinas College commemorated 60 years of educating students from the local parishes. A commemorative edition of Illuminare, the alumni magazine was created filled with photos, reflections and memories gathered from across alumni, staff and students.

Teaching and learning 

Teaching and Learning at Aquinas College is founded in their Mission. A love of learning grows in an environment that fosters strong relationships between the student and the teacher, based on a belief in the dignity of all. Aquinas students are encouraged to understand themselves as learners in order to reach their full potential. Students undertake a comprehensive curriculum incorporating literacy, numeracy, critical and creative thinking, problem solving and ICT. Visible learning promotes practices that maximise the impact of the teacher on student learning outcomes. This includes thinking about learning from the student’s perspective and particularly about higher order thinking skills. It shapes the way learning spaces are designed so that collaboration is enhanced and feedback is central to the learning process. The College endeavours to meet the interests and aspirations of every student with a comprehensive curriculum across Middle and Senior Years.  

Year 9 students are challenged with an experiential education program incorporating outdoor education, personal development and an outstanding Café program. Aquinas is well equipped with extensive Educational Support Services for students requiring learning support and an AGiLE Program for those seeking learning enhancement. They enjoy a long standing partnership with St Mary’s School for the Deaf with their students fully integrated into the learning program. Staff are highly skilled and supported in their teaching with state of the art ICT infrastructure and access to expert professional learning opportunities.

The College aims to assist students to embrace and harness their unique gifts by providing a broad comprehensive curriculum in the Middle Years, with increasing opportunity to pursue specific areas of interest as students proceed to the Senior Years. Students seeking University entrance have access to a wide variety of subjects in the Victorian Certificate of Education (VCE), whereas those interested in exploring vocational pathways have the Victorian Certificate of Applied Learning (VCAL) and a broad range of Vocational Education and Training (VET) certificates available. All supported by expert advice from Career Educators to guide the decision making process.

Grounds, buildings and facilities 

The college is situated approximately 25 kilometres from the centre of Melbourne and sits on 30 acres of land in its own green belt with native vegetation and sports areas surrounding it on three sides. The campus of Aquinas College consists of seven building blocks. These are: the Senior Years Building, the Year 9 building (the original school building), the Dominic Arts & Media Centre (including the Aquinas Resource Centre), the Staff and Technology Centre, the Gymnasium and Mahon Theatre, the Middle Years Learning Centre and the MacKillop Chapel.

The Senior Years Building contains the Year 12 Wing, social space and study facilities, as well as science labs, classrooms and computer facilities. The second floor is devoted to the Wurundjeri Trade Training Centre (WTTC), a purpose build kitchen and hospitality training centre use for VCE and VET subjects, as well as the Year 9 Cafe N9ne program.

The Middle Years Learning Centre was opened in 2014. The building serves Year 7 and 8 students and includes 18 classrooms, a 150-seat lecture theatre, a multipurpose heated staircase capable for team assemblies and several outdoor learning areas (including two upstairs balconies).

The Technology Centre, houses a fully operational Design & Technology workshop on the ground level and a Systems Technology & Hydraulics room on the second level. In addition, the school's grounds include tennis courts, three ovals for cricket and various codes of football and basketball courts for sporting purposes.

Extracurricular activities 
Students are encouraged to explore and develop their talents and learn to appreciate the gifts of others through participation in activities such as musicals, plays, choirs, bands, debating, robotics, study and cultural tours and a wide variety of individual and team sporting activities. The College offers opportunities for participation for both younger and older students with a Junior and Senior Musical each year. The music program is renowned and Concert, Rock and Jazz bands and Vocal ensembles create opportunities for students to perform both at Aquinas and in the wider community. An individual music lesson program ensures that talents are nurtured by high quality professional musicians.

The House system provides for healthy intra school rivalry at our swimming, athletics and cross country carnivals each year. As a founding member of Eastern Independent Schools Melbourne (EISM) Aquinas provides inter school sporting competition in a diverse range of disciplines. Affiliation with School Sport Victoria ensures that elite athletes qualify to compete at the highest levels within Victoria. All students, whether seasoned athletes or first time participants are welcomed to share in the thrill of participation, learn the skills of good sportsmanship and share the graciousness that comes with both a win and a loss.

Student leadership is valued at Aquinas and opportunities are provided at each level to represent peers and develop student voice. Student leaders discuss matters pertinent to student wellbeing and contribute to discussions regarding the strategic direction of the College. College Captains represent the student body in a range of forums and Assemblies are student led. A Year 12 Leader is selected each year to join the College Board to provide a student perspective to our governing body. Students also volunteer as College Ambassadors, leading tours for prospective families and sharing personal insights about College life.

Sport 
Aquinas is a member of the Eastern Independent Schools of Melbourne (EISM).

EISM premierships 
Aquinas has won the following EISM senior premierships.

EISM Senior Premierships

Boys:

Athletics - 2017
Basketball (8) - 2010, 2015, 2016, 2017, 2018, 2019, 2020, 2021
Cricket (4) - 2011, 2017, 2020, 2021
Cross Country - 2022
Football (7) - 2010, 2014, 2016, 2017, 2018, 2019, 2022
Hockey - 2020
Netball - 2022
Soccer - 2016
Softball (2) - 2019, 2020
Swimming - 2015
Table Tennis - 2018
Tennis (4) - 2010, 2011, 2013, 2018
Touch Rugby - 2022
Volleyball (2) - 2019, 2022

Girls:

Basketball (10) - 2010, 2011, 2012, 2013, 2014, 2015, 2017, 2019, 2020, 2021
Football - 2014
Netball (9) - 2011, 2012, 2013, 2014, 2015, 2016, 2018, 2019, 2022
Soccer (2) - 2019, 2021
Softball (2) - 2012, 2016
Tennis (3) - 2014, 2016, 2020
Ultimate Frisbee (4) - 2015, 2016, 2019, 2020
Volleyball (2) - 2014, 2020

Aquinas has won the following EISM Year 9 premierships.

Year 9 Boys:

 Badminton - 2015
 Basketball (7) - 2012, 2013, 2016, 2017, 2018, 2019, 2020
 Cricket (2) - 2013, 2014
 Football (2) - 2017, 2018
 Hockey (3) - 2019, 2020, 2022
 Indoor Cricket (4) - 2016, 2017, 2018, 2019
 Indoor Soccer (6) - 2011, 2012, 2014, 2015, 2017, 2021
 Netball (7) - 2014, 2015, 2016, 2017, 2018, 2019, 2022
 Soccer (4) - 2014, 2015, 2017, 2018
 Softball (4) - 2014, 2018, 2021, 2022
 Table Tennis - 2018
 Tennis (3) - 2020, 2021, 2022
 Touch Rugby (6) - 2010, 2015, 2017, 2018, 2019, 2021
 Ultimate Frisbee - 2014
 Volleyball (4) - 2013, 2014, 2017, 2022

Year 9 Girls:

 Badminton (6) - 2012, 2014, 2016, 2017, 2018, 2019
 Basketball (12) - 2010, 2011, 2012, 2013, 2014, 2015, 2016, 2017, 2018, 2019, 2020, 2021
 Football - 2019
 Hockey - 2016
 Indoor Cricket (2) - 2012, 2020
 Indoor Soccer - 2022
 Lawn Bowls (3) - 2014, 2015, 2019
 Netball (10) - 2011, 2012, 2013, 2014, 2015, 2016, 2017, 2018, 2019, 2022
 Soccer (4) - 2012, 2013, 2017, 2022
 Softball (4) - 2010, 2011, 2020, 2021
 Table Tennis (5) - 2013, 2014, 2015, 2016, 2017
 Tennis (4) - 2013, 2015, 2020, 2022
 Touch Rugby (4) - 2010, 2014, 2016, 2017
 Ultimate Frisbee (2) - 2013, 2014
 Volleyball (2) - 2018, 2022

Alumni 
Havana Brown – DJ, singer and dancer
Alan Dupont – Chair of International Security and Director of the Centre for International Security Studies at the University of Sydney
Marita Hird – Australian paralympic equestrian
Daniel Kickert – basketballer for the Hawke's Bay Hawks, and formerly the Sydney Kings, Brisbane Bullets, and Melbourne United.
Davey Lane – from Australian bands You Am I and The Pictures
Peter Leahy – Chief of Army, 2002–2008
Nick Malceski – former AFL footballer for the Sydney Football Club, and the Gold Coast Football Club
Liam Shiels – AFL footballer for the Hawthorn Football Club
Michael Sukkar - Australian politician
Maritza Wales – convicted of being an accomplice in the Society Murders
James Parsons- AFL footballer

See also 
 List of schools in Victoria
 List of high schools in Victoria

References

External Links 

 List of alumni - https://www.aquinas.vic.edu.au/alumni

Catholic secondary schools in Melbourne
Educational institutions established in 1961
Eastern Independent Schools of Melbourne
1961 establishments in Australia
Ringwood, Victoria
Buildings and structures in the City of Maroondah